Eliel Lind Osorio (born January 7, 1981 in Rio Grande, Puerto Rico), best known only as  Eliel, is a Latín Music, ballad, reggaeton, and urban producer.  His partnership with Don Omar has led him to critical acclaim and commercial success.

Biography
He was raised by his grandparents that would later help him achieve his greatest dream, to be the best producer in the industry. He began as a musician in the 1st Baptist Church in Loiza, Puerto Rico as a percussionist. It is then that his mother makes him learn the piano since the church's choir was missing a pianist. He already dominated the bongo, drums, and the congas. Although he was reluctant to learn the piano, it was thanks to this great instrument that he stood out among all other producers. Giving a unique and incomparable touch to his music is how Eliel consecrated himself as the best producer in the reggaeton scene.

Music career
At the age of 15, his grandparents built in his room next to his bed and among his personal belongings a small recording studio, where he began recording Christian and even some political jingles. His work was going full steam ahead, and again his grandparents trusting their grandson's talent was gaining seriousness they decide to give him the second story of their house. It is here where Eliel prepared a more elaborate recording studio where he began experimenting with reggaeton. At 16, known as DJ Menor, he began his work with the most successful rappers at the time: Baby Rasta & Gringo, Bebe, Hornyman y Pantyman, Charlie y Felito, among others. Later on he is offered a professional contract and moves to Santurce, Puerto Rico, close by to all the record companies. It was in the Santurce area where he met the then rookie artist, Don Omar, his now colleague and best friend. Immediately he signs a contract with the record company VI Music to record the voices of all of their artists. His made his first musical track for Daddy Yankee y Nicky Jam for the album Las Gargolas. Upon listening to it the singers did not believe it had been made by Eliel and thought it was a track taken out of a movie soundtrack. It is this special musical touch in his tracks in which he includes different rhythms and musical instruments that make his tracks something hard to believe. He has created more musical tracks that are the representation of the reggaeton scene in Puerto Rico; these are "Donde estan las Gatas" in the voice of Daddy Yankee, "Salen Inquietas" by Magnate y Valentino, and "Dile" and "Vuelve" in the voice of Don Omar. In 2002 he worked on the albums La Reconquista of the former duo Héctor & Tito, a compilation of various artists Mas Flow 1, and on "Don Omar: The Last Don (album)." With his success in the reggaeton world, his colleagues tried to give him an artistic name, but the name Eliel was already established. It is because of his shy nature that he becomes known as "the one that speaks with his hands" and has been consecrated as the genius behind the music that is taking over. Eliel has produced hit songs and converted them into hits.for reggaeton stars such as Daddy Yankee, Don Omar, Héctor el Father, Magnate y Valentino, amongst others. Eliel recently worked with Don Omar's new recording production, King of Kings, and in the production Reggaeton Confessions, where exponents of different musical genres are uniting with reggaeton.

Recent events
Eliel said he had been resigned to the Orfanato Music Group and had gone to WY Records but this was denied after a while, which means that Eliel can work with anyone. He signed with Pina Records .

Discography

2004 El Que Habla Con Las Manos
2005 Greatest Beats
2008 Beat Collection

References

1981 births
Living people
People from Río Grande, Puerto Rico
Reggaeton record producers